Darbari-ye Mohammad Hoseyn Zilayi (also Romanized as Dārbarī-ye Moḩammad Ḩoseyn Zīlāyī; also known as Dārbarī-ye Soflá) is a village in Margown Rural District, Margown District, Boyer-Ahmad County, Kohgiluyeh and Boyer-Ahmad Province, Iran. At the 2006 census, its population was 271, in 49 families.

References 

Populated places in Boyer-Ahmad County